Zhang Da may refer to either of the following persons:

 Zhang Da (張達), a subordinate of the Three Kingdoms period general Zhang Fei. He and his colleague Fan Qiang assassinated Zhang Fei. See Zhang Fei#Death.
 Zhang Da (eunuch), one of the chief officers under the Ming Dynasty admiral Zheng He.